The 1909 Case football team represented the Case School of Applied Science, now a part of Case Western Reserve University, during the 1909 college football season. The team's head coach was Joe Fogg. Case compiled a 6–1–2 record outscoring their opponents 141–32.

Schedule

References

Case
Case Western Reserve Spartans football seasons
Case football